Chakradhar Behera (1894–1973), popularly known as Biplabi (Insurgent), was a leader of the Peasant Rebellion or Movement against the king of the Kanika estate. He was also a politician of the Indian National Congress from Odisha.

Early life
Chakradhar Behera was born on 16 July 1894 in an Odia Hindu Gopal (Yadav) family at Ankapada village, Bhadrak district of Odisha. He passed his matriculation from Bhadrak high school in the year 1918 and then the king of the Kanika estate appointed him as his accountant.

Kanika Movement leadership
By December 1921 the Raja of Kanika decided to undertake a new illegal settlement of revenue collations. This became a constant source of friction between the Raja and the tenants. At the time he worked as an accountant of the king, he resigned from his post and organised agitation against the Raja so as to secure the rights of the tenants. Under his leadership a meeting was organised in January 1922. The Raja of Kanika and British authorities wholly co-operated with each other in suppressing the tenants. He bowed neither to the Kanika Raja nor to British authorities and then the high court arrested him on 29 June 1930 for having taken the lead in the no tax campaign.

However, this movement worked from 1922 until Independence under his leadership for more than twenty-five years. It was a part of the Non-cooperation movement, and was both anti-feudal and anti-imperialiastic in character.

References

1894 births
1973 deaths
Members of the Constituent Assembly of India
Indian independence activists from Odisha
Indian National Congress politicians
People from Bhadrak district
Utkal Congress politicians
Indian National Congress politicians from Odisha